Stilpnogaster aemula is a species of 'stiletto flies' belonging to the family Asilidae.

Subspecies
Subspecies include:
Stilpnogaster aemula aemula (Meigen, 1820) 
Stilpnogaster aemula setiventris (Zetterstedt, 1860)

Distribution
This species is present in part of Europe (Austria, Czech Republic, France, Germany, Italy, Poland, Romania, Slovakia, Sweden, former Yugoslavia and Switzerland).

Description 
Face is covered with pubescence and shows a narrow shiny longitudinal marking. Tergites and sternites are shiny black, with tomentose hind margins of each segment. Discal bristles on tergites are well-developed. Metatarsus of mid leg is of usual length.

Gallery

References

External links
 
 
 Galerie Insecte

Asilidae
Insects described in 1820